Wierzejskiella is a genus of rotifers belonging to the family Dicranophoridae.

The species of this genus are found in Europe and America.

Species:
 Wierzejskiella ambigua (Tzschaschel, 1979) 
 Wierzejskiella elongata (Glascott, 1893)

References

Ploima
Rotifer genera